Speed Madness is a 1925 American silent action film directed by Bruce Mitchell and starring Frank Merrill, Clara Horton and Joseph W. Girard.

Synopsis
Ted Bromley an automobile enthusiast and inventor, develops a revolutionary new engine valve design. He falls in love with Alice Carey and prevents her being swindled.

Cast
 Frank Merrill as Ted Bromley
 Clara Horton as Alice Carey	
 Evelyn Sherman	
 Garry O'Dell		
 Joseph W. Girard
 James Quinn
 Gino Corrado

References

Bibliography
 Connelly, Robert B. The Silents: Silent Feature Films, 1910-36, Volume 40, Issue 2. December Press, 1998.
 Munden, Kenneth White. The American Film Institute Catalog of Motion Pictures Produced in the United States, Part 1. University of California Press, 1997.

External links
 

1925 films
1920s action films
American silent feature films
American auto racing films
American action films
American black-and-white films
Films directed by Bruce M. Mitchell
1920s English-language films
1920s American films